Team Silent was a development team within Konami Computer Entertainment Tokyo (KCET), responsible for the first four games in the Silent Hill franchise by Konami released from 1999 to 2004. Later titles were developed by non-Japanese companies such as Climax Studios, Double Helix Games and Vatra Games. According to composer Akira Yamaoka, Team Silent consisted of staff members that had failed at other projects and originally intended to leave the company before the first Silent Hill game turned out to be a success. According to a Silent Hill: Homecoming artist, Team Silent was ultimately disbanded by Konami itself, because Konami wanted Western developers to make the games. KCET was merged into the parent company in April 2005.

Key members of Team Silent include:
Keiichiro Toyama: Director of Silent Hill. Left to join Japan Studio (Project Siren) in 1999 and created the Siren series of games.
Masashi Tsuboyama: Background designer of Silent Hill, director of Silent Hill 2, art director of Silent Hill 4: The Room. Left Konami to join Good-Feel.
Kazuhide Nakazawa: Director of Silent Hill 3. He later joined Kojima Productions.
Suguru Murakoshi: Drama director of Silent Hill 2, director and scenario writer of Silent Hill 4: The Room. He later joined Kojima Productions.
Hiroyuki Owaku: Scenario writer of Silent Hill 2 and Silent Hill 3, co-writer for Silent Hill.
Masahiro Ito: Background and creature designer of Silent Hill, art director and creature designer of Silent Hill 2 and Silent Hill 3.
Akira Yamaoka: Series sound director; producer of Silent Hill 3 and Silent Hill 4: The Room. Left Konami to join Grasshopper Manufacture.
Gozo Kitao: Executive producer of Silent Hill, Silent Hill 2 and Silent Hill 3.
Akihiro Imamura: Lead programmer of Silent Hill, producer of Silent Hill 2, sub-producer of Silent Hill 4: The Room.
Takayoshi Sato: CGI Creator of Silent Hill and Silent Hill 2. Left to join Virtual Heroes, Inc., and later joined Nintendo in 2012 as a visual producer.

Akira Yamaoka played a major role in the Silent Hill film adaptation by overseeing and approving specific aspects of the movie throughout its production. Some of the original members (as led by Toyama, director of the first Silent Hill game) went on to create the Siren series, which has a similar atmosphere to the Silent Hill franchise.

In 2017, when asked if Team Silent would ever reunite, Yamaoka said he was not against the idea, but also said that "it's hard to say because everyone has evolved, and maybe the mindset has changed as well. Also, the technology and the games industry as a whole has changed as well. Even if we got back together I'm not even sure we could do something great so it's very hard to say at the moment".

References

Konami
Silent Hill
Japanese companies established in 1996
Japanese companies disestablished in 2005
Video game companies established in 1996
Video game companies disestablished in 2005
Video game development companies
Defunct video game companies of Japan